Sunshine Suites was a business incubator in New York City. It was founded in 2001 and  managed by Sunshine Realty Management. In September 2010, Wall Street Journal, included Sunshine Suites in a list of locations tech entrepreneurs should consider if they're hunting for office space in New York City.  , it had closed its doors.

On November 3, 2010, New York City broke ground on its sixth business incubator and the first in the Bronx called the Sunshine Bronx Business Incubator.  This is a joint venture between the New York City Economic Development Corporation and Sunshine Suites, and located in the Hunt's Point Banknote Building.

The 2012 SmartPitch Challenge is a business pitch competition borne out of the partnership between Sunshine Bronx Business Incubator, NYCEDC, CUNY Institute for Virtual Enterprise, Baruch's Lawnrence N Field Center for Entrepreneurship, and IBM.  The competition was announced at the Sunshine Bronx ribbon-cutting ceremony by Mayor Michael Bloomberg and commences February 3, 2012, with a kick-off event featuring Justin Cohen from Summit Series.  The winners of this inaugural competition will receive mentorship from IBM entrepreneurial experts, office space at the Sunshine Bronx Business Incubator, admission to Entrepreneurial Boot Camp in Vermont during the summer of 2012, and an official launch for their business plans in Fall 2012.

External links 
 Official Sunshine Suites Website
 smartpitch.org

See also
List of business incubators

References

Companies based in New York City
Companies established in 2001
Business incubators of the United States
Companies disestablished in 2017